Scoliini is a cosmopolitan tribe of the family Scoliidae.

Genera 
Genera within this tribe include:

Austroscolia  Betrem, 1927 
Diliacos Saussure & Sichel, 1864 
Laeviscolia Betrem, 1928 
Liacos Guérin-Méneville, 1838 
Megascolia Betrem, 1928
Microscolia Betrem, 1928
Mutilloscolia Bradley, 1959
Pyrrhoscolia Bradley, 1957
Scolia Fabricius 1775
Triscolia de Saussure 1863

References 

Parasitic wasps
Scoliidae